Thomas Foon Chew (1889-1932) was an immigrant from China, who became the richest Chinese American in California.  In 1918, Chew bought 4 acres of land in what is now Palo Alto, California, where he constructed Bayside Canning Company.

Chew's building once housed Frys Electronics.  , the now empty building's fate is being debated.

References
 

1889 births
1932 deaths
Chinese emigrants to the United States
People from Palo Alto, California
20th-century Chinese businesspeople